Amphicrossus is a genus of sap-feeding beetles in the family Nitidulidae. There are about nine described species in Amphicrossus.

Species
These nine species belong to the genus Amphicrossus:
 Amphicrossus ciliatus (Olivier, 1811) i c g b
 Amphicrossus discolor Erichson, 1843 g
 Amphicrossus hirtus Kirejtshuk, 2005 g
 Amphicrossus japonicus Reitter, 1873 g
 Amphicrossus lewisi Reitter, 1873 g
 Amphicrossus liebecki (Parsons, 1943) i c g
 Amphicrossus lobanovi Kirejtshuk, 2005 g
 Amphicrossus niger Horn, 1879 i c g b
 Amphicrossus opinatus Kirejtshuk, 2005 g
Data sources: i = ITIS, c = Catalogue of Life, g = GBIF, b = Bugguide.net

References

Further reading

External links

 

Nitidulidae